Maryland Route 303 (MD 303) is a state highway in the U.S. state of Maryland.  The state highway runs  from MD 309 in Cordova north to MD 404 in Queen Anne.  MD 303 is an L-shaped highway that passes through the northeast corner of Talbot County and the southeast corner of Queen Anne's County.  The state highway also passes very close to the birthplace of Frederick Douglass.  MD 303 was originally designated along Starr Road between Queen Anne and U.S. Route 213 (US 213) south of Centreville, while present MD 303 is part of the old alignment of MD 309.  The original MD 303 was constructed in the late 1920s and early 1930s, with a gap near Starr filled in the late 1940s.  MD 309 absorbed MD 303 in 1955.  MD 303 was assigned to its present course in 1961.

Route description

MD 303 begins at an intersection with MD 309 (Cordova Road) a short distance north of the village of Cordova in Talbot County.  The state highway heads east as two-lane undivided Tappers Corner Road, passing under an abandoned railroad grade owned by the Maryland Department of Transportation and crossing a pair of branches of Tuckahoe Creek.  MD 303 turns north onto Lewistown Road at Tappers Corner very close to the birthplace of Frederick Douglass.  After crossing Norwich Creek, the state highway has a short concurrency with MD 404 Alternate (Talbot Avenue), during which MD 303 enters the town of Queen Anne.  The state highway turns north onto Main Street to pass through the center of town and enters Queen Anne's County at the intersection with Park Avenue.  MD 303 leaves the town after crossing the railroad grade and intersects MD 309, which heads southwest as Cordova Road and northwest as Starr Road.  MD 303 turns northeast onto Cordova Road and comes to its northern terminus at a right-in/right-out intersection with the eastbound lanes of MD 404 (Queen Annes Highway).  Traffic must use MD 309 for connections with the westbound lanes of MD 404.

History
The present MD 303 was originally part of MD 309. MD 303's first incarnation was between Queen Anne and US 213 (now MD 213) south of Centreville. Construction began in 1925 from Queen Anne. Another  was paved toward Starr by 1930. The gap between the two sections was filled in two sections in 1949 and 1950. The first edition of MD 303 was assumed by MD 309 in 1955 when the latter highway was extended north from its terminus in Queen Anne to US 213. MD 303 was assigned to the old alignment of MD 309 between Cordova and Queen Anne in 1961 following the construction of MD 309's present alignment between Cordova and Queen Anne that parallels the railroad grade. The section of MD 303 between MD 309 and MD 404 in Queen Anne became one-way northbound in 2004; this section became a two-way road again in 2016.

Junction list

See also

References

External links

MDRoads: MD 303

303
Maryland Route 303
Maryland Route 303